Emídio da Silva Graça (17 May 1931 – 1992) was a former Portuguese footballer who played as midfielder.

Football career 

Graça gained 12 caps for Portugal and made his debut 4 May 1955 in Glasgow against Scotland, in a 0-3 defeat.

References

External links 
 
 

1931 births
1992 deaths
Portuguese footballers
Association football midfielders
Primeira Liga players
Vitória F.C. players
Portugal international footballers